The United States's Arbor nuclear test series was a group of 18 nuclear tests conducted in 1973–1974. These tests followed the Operation Toggle series and preceded the Operation Bedrock series.

References

Explosions in 1973
Explosions in 1974
1973 in military history
1974 in military history
Arbor